Ptilagrostis kingii is a species of grass known by the common names Sierra false needlegrass and King's ricegrass. It is endemic to the high mountains of the Sierra Nevada of California, where it grows in meadows and near streams in subalpine and alpine climates.

Description 
It is a tuft-forming perennial bunchgrass growing 20 to 40 centimeters tall with narrow, rolled leaves. The narrow inflorescence is made up of a few upright branches lined with spikelets. Each spikelet has an awn up to 1.4 centimeters long which may be bent.

References

External links
Jepson Manual Treatment
USDA Plants Profile
Photo gallery

Pooideae
Native grasses of California
Bunchgrasses of North America
Endemic flora of California
Flora of the Sierra Nevada (United States)
Flora without expected TNC conservation status